The first USS Ibis (SP-3051), also listed as USS Ibis (ID-3051), was a United States Navy minesweeper in commission from 1918 to 1919.

Ibis was built as the commercial fishing trawler Sea Gull by the Globe Shipbuilding Company at Superior, Wisconsin, in 1917. In June 1918, the U.S. Navy acquired her from her owner, the Atlantic Coast Fisheries Company of New York City, for use as a minesweeper during World War I. She was commissioned on 19 August 1918 as USS Ibis (SP-3051 or, perhaps retrospectively, ID-3051).

Assigned to the 1st Naval District in northern New England, Ibis operated for the remainder of World War I and into 1919. Sometime in mid-1918 she accidentally rammed the patrol vessel  while Satilla was alongside the Hodge Boiler Works pier at Rockville, Maine. Satilla suffered considerable damage, with her hull buckled in on the port side and leaking, and was under repair for the next few months, not returning to duty until after the end of World War I.

Ibis was decommissioned after the end of World War I and was returned to her owner on 3 March 1919.

Notes

References
 USS Ibis (SP-3051)
 USS Satilla (SP-687)
ID-3051 Sea Gull at Department of the Navy Naval History and Heritage Command Online Library of Selected Images: U.S. Navy Ships -- Listed by Hull Number "SP" #s and "ID" #s -- World War I Era Patrol Vessels and other Acquired Ships and Craft numbered from ID # 3000 through SP-3099
NavSource Online: Section Patrol Craft Photo Archive Ibis (SP 3051)

Minesweepers of the United States Navy
World War I minesweepers of the United States
Ships built in Superior, Wisconsin
1917 ships
Maritime incidents in 1918